Smoke and Mirrors is the fifth studio album by the American singer-songwriter Brett Dennen. It was released on October 22, 2013, by F-Stop Music/Atlantic Records. The album peaked at number 65 on the Billboard 200 album chart, number 10 on Billboard's Top Independent Albums chart, and number 19 on ''Billboard'''s Top Rock Albums chart.

Track listing

References

2013 albums
Brett Dennen albums
Atlantic Records albums